Belvidere School is a coeducational secondary school located in the Belvidere area of Shrewsbury, Shropshire, England. Belvidere draws 11- to 16-year-olds mainly from the surrounding areas of Monkmoor, Belvidere, Underdale, Abbey Forgate and Cherry Orchard. It is sited in grounds bordering open fields down to the River Severn The school performs well in local school sport competitions.

The school became a Technology College in 2003, specialising in Technology, Science and Mathematics. In 2008 it received a second speciality as a Training School.

Previously a community school administered by Shropshire Council, in January 2019 Belvidere School converted to academy status. The school is now sponsored by the Central Shropshire Academy Trust.

Notable former pupils
Jonathan Anders (cricketer, born 1971)
William Davies (cricketer, born 1972)
Billy Jones (footballer, born 1987)

References

External links
Belvidere School official website

Schools in Shrewsbury
Secondary schools in Shropshire
Academies in Shropshire